James E. Sterling (born 1838, date of death unknown) was a Union Navy sailor in the American Civil War and a recipient of the U.S. military's highest decoration, the Medal of Honor, for his actions at the Battle of Mobile Bay.

Biography
Born in 1838 in Baltimore, Maryland, Sterling was still living in that city when he joined the Navy. At the Battle of Mobile Bay on August 5, 1864, he helped supply ammunition to Brooklyn's guns despite being wounded, and continued at this task until receiving a second wound. For this action, he was awarded the Medal of Honor four months later, on December 31, 1864.

Sterling's official Medal of Honor citation reads:
On board the U.S.S. Brooklyn during successful attacks against Fort Morgan, rebel gunboats and the ram Tennessee in Mobile Bay, on 5 August 1864. Although wounded when heavy enemy return fire raked the decks of his ship, Sterling courageously remained at his post and continued passing shell until struck down a second time and completely disabled.
Burial:
Western Cemetery 
Baltimore
Baltimore City
Maryland, USA
Plot: Area M, Lot 271, Grave 1

References 

1838 births
Year of death missing
Military personnel from Baltimore
People of Maryland in the American Civil War
Union Navy sailors
United States Navy Medal of Honor recipients
American Civil War recipients of the Medal of Honor